Toni Meglenski (born 22 May 1981) is a former Macedonian football player and manager. He is the current manager of FK Pobeda.

Playing career

International
He made his senior debut for Macedonia in a February 2003 friendly match against Poland and has earned a total of 3 caps. His final international was a November 2005 friendly against Liechtenstein.

Honours
Pobeda Prilep
Macedonian First League: 2
Winner: 2003–04, 2006–07
Macedonian Cup: 1
Winner: 2001–02

References

External links
 

1981 births
Living people
Sportspeople from Prilep
Association football midfielders
Macedonian footballers
FK Pobeda players
NK Međimurje players
KF Elbasani players
FK Vardar players
OFK Petrovac players
FK 11 Oktomvri players
FK Pelister players
FK Tikvesh players
Macedonian First Football League players
Kategoria Superiore players
Montenegrin First League players
Macedonian Second Football League players
Macedonian expatriate footballers
Expatriate footballers in Croatia
Macedonian expatriate sportspeople in Croatia
Expatriate footballers in Albania
Macedonian expatriate sportspeople in Albania
Expatriate footballers in Montenegro
Macedonian expatriate sportspeople in Montenegro
Macedonian football managers
FK Pobeda managers
North Macedonia international footballers